Jenna Rosenthal (born May 14, 1996) is an American professional volleyball player who plays as a middle blocker. She has played for the U.S. national team. Professionally, she has played in Finland, Germany, and most recently in 2022, the United States. Collegiately, she played for Marquette University from 2014–2018.

Career

College

Rosenthal played volleyball for Marquette University from 2014–2018. She graduated with a degree in engineering.

Rosenthal's most notable seasons were from 2016–2018. She was named on the First Team for the Big East Conference all 3 seasons.

Professional clubs

  LP Viesti (2018–2019)
  Allianz MTV Stuttgart (2019–2021)
  Athletes Unlimited (2022)

USA National Team
Rosenthal made her national team debut in 2019, playing in the 2019 Pan American Games, USA finished in 7th place. She also represented USA at the  2019 Pan American Cup, earning a gold medal with the team.

Awards and honors

Clubs

2020–2021 German Bundesliga  –  Silver medal, with Allianz MTV Stuttgart
2020–2021 German Cup –  Bronze Medal, with Allianz MTV Stuttgart
2019–2020 German Super Cup –  Silver Medal, with Allianz MTV Stuttgart
2019–2020 German Cup –  Silver Medal, with Allianz MTV Stuttgart
2018–2019 Finland Cup –  Bronze Medal, with LP Viesti
2018–2019 Finland Mestaruusliiga –  Gold Medal, with LP Viesti

International

2019  Pan-American Cup, Gold Medal with the U.S. National Team.

Individual

2022 Athletes Unlimited - "Best Middle Blocker"
Big East All-Conference First-Team (2016, 2017, 2018)
AVCA All-East Coast Honorable Mention (2018)
AVCA All-East Coast (2016, 2017)

External links
CEV League Profile

References

1996 births
Living people
Sportspeople from Fond du Lac, Wisconsin
Middle blockers
American women's volleyball players
Marquette Golden Eagles women's volleyball players
American expatriate sportspeople in Finland
American expatriate sportspeople in Germany
Expatriate volleyball players in Finland
Expatriate volleyball players in Germany